Anacithara modica is a species of sea snail, a marine gastropod mollusk in the family Horaiclavidae.

Description
The length of the ovate-fusiform, pink to purple, semitransparent shell attains 6 mm, its diameter 2½ mm. It contains 6 whorls. The aperture is small. The outer lip is much thickened and slightly sinuate on top..The columella has a slight callus.  The wide siphonal canal is very short.

Distribution
This marine species occurs off Japan and the Philippines.

References

External links
  Tucker, J.K. 2004 Catalog of recent and fossil turrids (Mollusca: Gastropoda). Zootaxa 682:1–1295.
 

modica
Gastropods described in 1882